Sokhon Yi (born 1 April 1951) is a Cambodian former breaststroke swimmer. He competed in three events at the 1972 Summer Olympics.

References

External links
 

1951 births
Living people
Cambodian male breaststroke swimmers
Olympic swimmers of Cambodia
Swimmers at the 1972 Summer Olympics
Place of birth missing (living people)
Swimmers at the 1974 Asian Games
Southeast Asian Games medalists in swimming
Southeast Asian Games gold medalists for Cambodia
Southeast Asian Games silver medalists for Cambodia
Competitors at the 1971 Southeast Asian Peninsular Games
Asian Games competitors for Cambodia